CUK may refer to:

 Catholic University of Korea, in Seoul & Bucheon, South Korea
 CUK is the ICAO airline designator for Polo Aviation, United Kingdom
 CUK is the IATA airport code for Caye Caulker Airport, Belize
 Cuk (instrument)
 Change UK, also known as The Independent Group for Change, a defunct UK political party

See also

 Ćuk converter - used in electronics
 Çük - an Idel-Ural festival
 Miloš Ćuk (b. 1990) - Serbian water polo player
 Slobodan Ćuk - inventor, electrical engineer after whom the Ćuk converter is named
 Vladimir Cuk (b. 1975) - Croatian actor and former basketball player